Kushnir is a Ukrainian and Jewish surname, meaning furrier.

Etymology
The root of the name is the old Slavic word for fur, кърьзно, which can be transliterated as "kyrizno" or "kurizno" ("ъ" is the Slavic letter designating an ultra-short vowel, as for instance the "y" in "Katyusha").  The Polish word for furrier is Kuśnierz, also used as a surname, with similar words and names found in Serbo-Croatian. 
 
Through the Slavic fur merchants, the word was also adopted into Germanic languages and evolved for instance into the modern German and Swedish words for furrier, Kürschner and körsnär respectively.  Yiddish is a language lexically based to a large degree on German, and therefore a Yiddish-speaking Jew living in Ukraine or Poland could relate to the local word for furrier both through the local Slavic language, as through his mother tongue.

Variations
There are many variations of the Ukrainian name Kushnir from all over Central Europe. In the west the name starts in Germany as Kuschner and variations of it run through the Czech Republic, Slovakia, Hungary to Ukraine in the east and others. The derivatives may include Kushnirenko, Kushnirchuk, Kushnirovych, Kushnirak, Kushnirov, Kushnariv, Kushnarev, Kushner, Cushner, Kusznir, Kusnir, Kuśnierz, Romanian Cușmir, and others.

Notable people sharing the surname "Kushnir"
 Alex Kushnir, Israeli politician
 Alla Kushnir, a Russian–born Israeli chess Woman Grandmaster
Alla Kushnir, a Ukrainian belly dancer
 Anton Syarhyeyevich Kushnir (born 1984), a Belarusian aerial skier
 Asher Kushnir, Russian lecturer
 David Kushnir (born 1931), Israeli Olympic long-jumper

Notable people sharing variations of the name

Kušnier
 Peter Kušnier (1894, Huty – 1944)

Kušnír
 Ondřej Kušnír
 Silvia Kušnírová

Kusnir
 Zack Kusnir

Other forms
 Kushner - Ashkenazi Jewish surname
 Kušnirák (Slovak form)

References 

Ukrainian words and phrases
Slavic words and phrases
Ukrainian-language surnames
Jewish surnames
Occupational surnames
Surnames of Ukrainian origin